Happy Feet is a 2006 computer-animated jukebox musical comedy film directed, produced, and co-written by George Miller. It stars the voices of Elijah Wood, Robin Williams, Brittany Murphy, Hugh Jackman, Nicole Kidman, Hugo Weaving, and E.G. Daily. An international co-production between the United States and Australia, the film was produced at Sydney-based visual effects and animation studio Animal Logic for Warner Bros. Pictures, Village Roadshow Pictures, and Kingdom Feature Productions, and was released in North American theaters on November 17, 2006, and in Australian theaters on December 26, 2006. It is the first animated film produced by Kennedy Miller and Animal Logic. Set in the cold land of Antarctica, the film follows Mumble, an emperor penguin who, despite his lacking the ability to sing the heartsong to attract a soul mate, is able to tap dance brilliantly. After being continuously ridiculed and rejected by peers and his own father, Mumble departs on a journey to learn what is causing the local fish population to decline--and to find himself along the way.

Though primarily an animated film, the film does incorporate motion capture of live action humans in certain scenes. The film was simultaneously released in both conventional theatres and in IMAX 2D format. The studio had hinted that a future IMAX 3D release was a possibility. However, Warner Bros., the film's production company, was on too tight a budget to release Happy Feet in IMAX digital 3D.

Happy Feet received generally positive reviews from critics with praise for its visuals, storyline and songs, and grossed $384 million against its $100 million production budget. It earned the recipient of the inaugural BAFTA Award for Best Animated Film, and the fourth non-Disney or Pixar film to win the Academy Award for Best Animated Feature. It was nominated for the Annie Award for Best Animated Feature and the Saturn Award for Best Animated Film, both losing to Cars. A sequel, Happy Feet Two, was released on November 18, 2011, but it was unable to replicate the critical and commercial success of the original film.

Plot

Every emperor penguin attracts a mate by singing a unique "heartsong". If the male penguin's heartsong matches the female's song, the two penguins mate. Norma Jean, a female penguin, falls for Memphis, a male penguin and they become mates. They lay an egg, which Memphis cares for while Norma Jean leaves with the other females to fish. While the males struggle through the harsh winter, Memphis briefly drops the egg. The resulting chick, Mumble, is unable to sing but can tap dance. Nevertheless, he is enamored with Gloria, a female penguin who is regarded as the most talented of her age. One day, Mumble encounters a group of hostile skua, with a leader who is tagged with a yellow band, which he says is from an alien abduction. Mumble narrowly escapes the hungry birds by falling into a crevice.

Now a young adult, Mumble is frequently ridiculed by the elders and their leader Noah. After escaping from a leopard seal attack, Mumble befriends five Adelie penguins named Ramón, Nestor, Lombardo, Rinaldo and Raul, known collectively as "the Amigos", who embrace Mumble's dance moves and assimilate him into their group. After seeing a hidden human excavator in an avalanche, they opt to ask Lovelace, a rockhopper penguin, about its origin. Lovelace has the plastic rings of a six pack entangled around his neck, saying that they have been bestowed upon him by mystic beings.

For the emperor penguins, it is mating season and Gloria is the center of attention. The Amigos unsuccessfully attempt to help Mumble win her affection by having Ramón sing a Spanish version of "My Way" behind Mumble, with the latter lip syncing. After Mumble desperately begins tap dancing in synch with her song, she falls for him and the youthful penguins join in for singing and dancing to "Boogie Wonderland". The elders are appalled by Mumble's conduct, which they see as the reason for their lean fishing season. Memphis begs Mumble to stop dancing, for his own sake, but when Mumble refuses, he is exiled.

Mumble and the Amigos return to Lovelace, only to find him being choked by the plastic rings. Lovelace confesses they were snagged on him while swimming off the forbidden shores, beyond the land of the elephant seals. Not long into their journey, Gloria encounters them, wishing to become Mumble's mate. Fearing for her safety, he ridicules Gloria, driving her away.

At the forbidden shore, Mumble, Lovelace and the Amigos are attacked by the two orcas, during which Lovelace gets free from the plastic rings. After escaping, they find a fishing boat. Mumble exhaustingly pursues it alone, eventually washing up on the shore of Florida, where he is rescued and kept at Sea World with Magellanic penguins. After a long and secluded confinement in addition to fruitlessly trying to communicate with the humans, he nearly succumbs to madness. When a girl attempts to interact with Mumble by tapping the glass, he starts dancing, which attracts a large crowd. He is released back into the wild, with a tracking device attached to his back. He returns to his colony and challenges the will of the elders. Memphis reconciles with him, just as a research team arrives, verifying Mumble's statements of "aliens" existing. The entire colony engages in dance in front of the research team, whose expedition footage prompts a worldwide debate, which eventually leads to the banning of all Antarctic overfishing, satisfying both the emperor penguins and the Amigos.

Cast

 Elijah Wood as Mumble
 E. G. Daily as baby Mumble
 Robin Williams as Ramón, Cletus, Lovelace, and the narrator
 Brittany Murphy as Gloria
 Alyssa Shafer as baby Gloria
 Hugh Jackman as Memphis
 Nicole Kidman as Norma Jean
 Hugo Weaving as Noah the Elder
 Fat Joe as Seymour
 Cesar Flores as baby Seymour
 Anthony LaPaglia as Skua Boss
 Magda Szubanski as Miss Viola
 Miriam Margolyes as Mrs. Astrakhan
 Steve Irwin as Trev
 Carlos Alazraqui as Nestor
 Lombardo Boyar as Raul
 Jeffrey Garcia as Rinaldo
 Johnny Sanchez as Lombardo
 Roger Rose as Leopard Seal

Production
George Miller cites as an initial inspiration for the film an encounter with a grizzled old cameraman, whose father was Frank Hurley of the Shackleton expeditions, during the shooting of Mad Max 2: "We were sitting in this bar, having a milkshake, and he looked across at me and said, ‘Antarctica.’ He'd shot a documentary there. He said, ‘You’ve got to make a film in Antarctica. It’s just like out here, in the wasteland. It’s spectacular.’ And that always stuck in my head."

Happy Feet was also partially inspired by earlier documentaries such as the BBC's Life in the Freezer. In 2001, during an otherwise non-sequitur meeting, Doug Mitchell impulsively presented Warner Bros., studio president Alan Horn with an early rough draft of the film's screenplay, and asked them to read it while he and Miller flew back to Australia. By the time they'd landed, Warner had decided to provide funding on the film. Production was slated to begin sometime after the completion of the fourth Mad Max film, Fury Road, but geo-political complications pushed Happy Feet to the forefront in early 2003.

The animation is invested heavily in motion capture technology, with the dance scenes acted out by human dancers. The tap-dancing for Mumble in particular was provided by Savion Glover who was also co-choreographer for the dance sequences. The dancers went through "Penguin School" to learn how to move like a penguin, and also wore head apparatus to mimic a penguin's beak.

Happy Feet needed an enormous group of computers, and Animal Logic worked with IBM to build a server farm with sufficient processing potential. The film took four years to make. Ben Gunsberger, Lighting Supervisor and VFX Department Supervisor, says this was partly because they needed to build new infrastructure and tools. The server farm used IBM BladeCenter framework and BladeCenter HS20 blade servers, which are extremely dense separate computer units each with two Intel Xeon processors. Rendering took up 17 million CPU hours over a nine-month period.

According to Miller, the environmental message was not a major part of the original script, but "In Australia, we're very, very aware of the ozone hole," he said, "and Antarctica is literally the canary in the coal mine for this stuff. So it sort of had to go in that direction." This influence led to a film with a more environmental tone. Miller said, "You can't tell a story about Antarctica and the penguins without giving that dimension."

The film was dedicated to the memory of Nick Enright, Michael Jonson, Robby McNeilly Green, and Steve Irwin.

Music
Happy Feet is a jukebox musical, taking previously recorded songs and working them into the film's soundtrack to fit with the mood of the scene or character. Two soundtrack albums were released for the film; one containing songs from and inspired by the film, and another featuring John Powell's instrumental score. They were released on 31 October 2006 and 19 December 2006, respectively.

Prince's "Song of the Heart" won the Golden Globe Award for Best Original Song. The film won Golden Trailer Award for Best Music. The song was written by Prince specifically for Happy Feet shortly after he was given a private screening of the film in order to gain his approval for the use of his song "Kiss" in a musical number. Prince enjoyed the film, gave his approval for the use of "Kiss" and offered to write an original song for the production, which he completed a week later.

Soundtrack

Happy Feet: Music from the Motion Picture is the lyrical soundtrack album from the 2006 animated film Happy Feet. As of March 2007, the OST has sold over 272,627 copies in the US.

Certifications

Reception

Box office
The film opened at number 1 in the United States on its first weekend of release (17–19 November), grossing $41.6 million and beating Casino Royale for the top spot. It remained number 1 for the Thanksgiving weekend, making $51.6 million over the five-day period. In total, the film was the top grosser for three weeks, a 2006 box office feat matched only by Pirates of the Caribbean: Dead Man's Chest. As of 8 June 2008,  Happy Feet had grossed $198.0 million in the U.S. and $186.3 million overseas, making about $384.3 million worldwide. Happy Feet was the third highest grossing animated film of 2006 in the U.S., behind Cars and Ice Age: The Meltdown. The film was released in about 35 international territories at the close of 2006.

The production budget was $100 million.

Critical reception

Happy Feet received generally positive reviews from critics. On review aggregator site Rotten Tomatoes, the film has a 76% "Certified Fresh" score based on 169 reviews, with an average rating of 6.9/10. The site's consensus reads, "Visually dazzling, with a thoughtful storyline and catchy musical numbers, Happy Feet marks a successful animated debut from the makers of Babe." Metacritic reports a 77 out of 100 rating, based on 30 critics, indicating "generally favorable reviews". Audiences polled by CinemaScore gave the film an average grade of "A-" on an A+ to F scale.

Analysis
The film garnered analysis and dissection from various critics. Film critic Yar Habnegnal wrote an essay in Forum on Contemporary Art and Society that examines the themes of encroachment presented throughout the film, as well as various other subtexts and themes, such as religious hierarchy and interracial tensions.  Vadim Rizov of IFC sees Mumble as just the latest in a long line of cinematic religious mavericks. Some Christians have also considered the film to be anti-Christian (or antireligious in general) due to the imagery and behaviours of various characters.

On a technical or formal level, the film has also been lauded in some corners for its innovative introduction of Miller's roving style of subjective cinematography into contemporary animation.

Home media
Happy Feet was released on home media on March 27, 2007, in the United States in three formats: DVD (in separate widescreen and pan-and-scan editions), Blu-ray Disc, and an HD DVD/DVD combo pack. Overall, Happy Feet was the third best-selling film of 2007 with 12.2 million units sold and earning a revenue of $196.9 million.

Among the DVD's special features is a scene that was cut from the film where Mumble meets a blue whale and an albatross while pursuing the fishing boat. The albatross was Steve Irwin's first voice role in the film before he voiced the elephant seal in the final cut. The scene was finished and included on the DVD in Irwin's memory. This scene is done in Irwin's classic documentary style, with the albatross telling the viewer all about the other characters in the scene, and the impact people are having on their environment. Another special feature included with the DVD is the 1936 Merrie Melodies short I Love to Singa.

Accolades
The film appeared on numerous critics' top ten lists of the best films of 2006.

Video games

A video game based on the film was developed by A2M and published by Midway Games. It has the same main cast as the film. It was released for the PC, PlayStation 2, GameCube, GBA, NDS, and Wii.

Artificial Life, Inc. has also developed a mobile game for the Japan market.

Sequel

Happy Feet Two was produced at Dr. D Studios and released on November 18, 2011. Wood and Williams reprised their roles for the sequel. Murphy was set to reprise her role and begin recording sometime in 2010, but was replaced by P!nk after Murphy died from pneumonia on December 20, 2009. Matt Damon and Brad Pitt signed on as Bill the Krill and Will the Krill respectively. The film was neither critically nor financially as successful as its predecessor and its performance at the box office resulted in Dr. D Studios closing down.

4-D attraction
Happy Feet 4-D Experience is a 12-minute 4D film shown at various 4D theaters over the world. It retells the condensed story of Happy Feet with the help of 3D projection and sensory effects, including moving seats, wind, mist and scents. Produced by SimEx-Iwerks, the 4D experience premiered in March 2010 at the Drayton Manor Theme Park. Other locations included Sea World (2010–2011), Shedd Aquarium (2010–2012), Moody Gardens (2010–2011), Nickelodeon Suites Resort, and Adventure Aquarium.

See also
 March of the Penguins — A 2005 nature documentary film about the real life emperor penguins. It won the 2005 Academy Award for Best Documentary Feature.

References

External links

 
 
 
 

2006 films
2006 computer-animated films
2000s adventure films
2000s American animated films
2000s buddy films
2000s musical films
2000s musical comedy films
American adventure comedy films
American buddy comedy films
American children's animated adventure films
American children's animated comedy films
American children's animated musical films
American computer-animated films
American musical comedy films
Animal Logic films
Animated buddy films
Animated films about penguins
Australian animated feature films
Australian children's films
Australian musical comedy films
Best Animated Feature Academy Award winners
Best Animated Feature BAFTA winners
Environmental films
Films directed by George Miller
Films produced by George Miller
Films about animals
Films set in Antarctica
Films with live action and animation
Kennedy Miller Mitchell films
Jukebox musical films
Films with atheism-related themes
Films with screenplays by George Miller
Films with screenplays by John Collee
Religious controversies in animation
Religious controversies in film
Village Roadshow Pictures animated films
Warner Bros. animated films
Warner Bros. films
Films scored by John Powell
Films using motion capture
2000s children's films
2006 comedy films
2000s English-language films